Gospel Greats is compilation of Sandi Patty's greatest hits from the Word catalogue.

Track listings
 "We Shall Behold Him"
 "Via Dolorosa"
 "Love In Any Language"
 "How Majestic Is Your Name"
 "God Of All Of Me"
 "Amazing Grace"
 "Unto Us"
 "Was It A Morning Like This"
 "Pour On The Power"
 "Love Can Open The Door"

2008 compilation albums
Gospel compilation albums
Sandi Patty albums